Punchbowl railway station is located on the Bankstown line, serving the Sydney suburb of Punchbowl. It is served by Sydney Trains T3 Bankstown line services.

History
Punchbowl station opened on 14 April 1909, when the Bankstown line was extended from Belmore to Bankstown.

Until it closed in the early 1990s, the Punchbowl Maintenance Depot lay to the north-west of the station.

Platforms and services

References

External links

Punchbowl station details Transport for New South Wales
Punchbowl Metro station Sydney Metro

City of Canterbury-Bankstown
Railway stations in Sydney
Railway stations in Australia opened in 1909
Bankstown railway line